Georgia and Romania have played each other on 27 occasions. Georgia have won 17 times, Romania 9 times and 1 match has been drawn. They regularly play each other in the Rugby Europe Championship (previously named European Nations Cup).

The first match was played on 18 November 1998 at Lansdowne Road that has been won by Romania 27–23.

The two sides have played each other once in a Rugby World Cup game in the 2011 Rugby World Cup in New Zealand. Georgia won the match 25–9.

Antim Cup

Since 2002, the winner of Georgia – Romania matches have been awarded the Antim Cup. It is named after the Romanian Orthodox Metropolitan Anthim the Iberian, who came from Georgia.
The Antim Cup is contested each time Georgia and Romania meet in a senior international match other than World Cup matches or qualifiers. The holder retains the cup unless the challenger wins the match in normal time. It is challenge cup along the lines of the Calcutta Cup and Bledisloe Cups to be annually played for between the Georgians and the Romanians.

Summary

Overall
Georgia and Romania have played each other on Rugby World Cup, Rugby World Cup qualification and in annual tournament - Rugby Europe Championship

Records
Note: Date shown in brackets indicates when the record was or last set.

Results

See also
History of rugby union matches between Georgia and Russia

Notes

References

Georgia national rugby union team matches
Romania national rugby union team matches
Rugby union rivalries